Cloven Hoof are an English heavy metal band from Wolverhampton, active from 1979 to 1990, and again from around 2000 onward. They were associated with the new wave of British heavy metal movement, alongside bands such as Iron Maiden, Saxon, and Diamond Head. Enduring many line-up changes, only founding bassist Lee Payne has remained a constant member throughout the decades.

Biography

Early years: 1979–1987
Cloven Hoof went through a number of early line-up changes before settling on a steady line-up that would last for their first few recordings. Theatrical from the beginning, the four band members took up pseudonyms based on the four elements: David "Water" Potter, Steve "Fire" Rounds, Lee "Air" Payne and Kevin "Earth" Poutney. This line-up recorded a successful demo tape in 1982, along with The Opening Ritual EP, and the debut Cloven Hoof album (1984).

Following the release of their self-titled debut, David Potter left the band to be replaced by Rob Kendrick, who took up the "Water" pseudonym. This line-up only managed to record the live album Fighting Back (1987) before splitting up, leaving Lee Payne as the sole remaining band member.

1988–1990
Lee Payne reactivated the band in 1988, hiring vocalist Russ North and guitarist Andy Wood from Tredegar along with drummer Jon Brown.

With a whole new set of musicians in place, the band dropped the stage names and went on to record two more albums: 1988's Dominator and 1989's A Sultan's Ransom. The former member of Tredegar, Lee Jones, was brought into the band as a second guitarist soon after the release of these two albums, but contractual difficulties caused the band to split up again in 1990.

2001–2007
In the summer of 2001, Lee Payne began putting together a new line-up for the next incarnation of Cloven Hoof (following a telephone conversation with Andy Wood regarding the contractual difficulties which had caused the band's decade-long split.)

The band completed a live appearance at the Keep It True II Festival at the Tauberfrankenhalle in Lauda-Königshofen, Germany on 10 April 2004.

Eye of the Sun was recorded and released in 2006, with the help of musicians Matt Moreton on vocals, Andy Shortland on guitars, and Lynch Radinsky on drums. Tom Galley produced the album. Due to the work commitments of various band members it was impossible for the unit to play live, so Lee Payne was once again obliged to enlist new personnel.

Vocalist Russ North returned to England and rejoined the band, after a period of time spent living in Spain. Eventually the band's line-up was completed by Mick Powell and Ben Read on guitars, with Jon Brown on drums.

2008–present
A collection of re-recorded songs - The Definitive Part One - was released in early 2008, with a new EP to be called Throne of Damnation scheduled for release in 2010.

In 2008, Cloven Hoof co-headlined the Metal Brew Festival in Mill Hill with Pagan Altar. Both bands also performed at the British Steel IV Festival at the Camden Underworld in 2009.

On 27 June 2009, Cloven Hoof appeared at the Bang Your Head!!! festival in Balingen, Germany. They featured on the bill alongside bands such as W.A.S.P., U.D.O., Blind Guardian and Journey, playing their set in torrential rain.

The track Nightstalker, from the band's debut album, was used in the soundtrack for the Brütal Legend computer game.

In early 2010, following the exit of Russ North, Matt Moreton was hired to record the vocals that appeared on the Throne of Damnation EP. Moreton left the band due to ill health soon afterwards. On 13 December 2010, Cloven Hoof released their first DVD, A Sultan's Ransom - Video Archive, comprising footage of a 1989 concert at Lichfield Art Centre and also featuring two music videos for the songs "Mad, Mad World" and "Highlander", both from A Sultan's Ransom.

2011 saw Lee Payne rebuilding the band, bringing in guitarist Joe Whelan from the band Dementia and guitarist Chris Coss from UK/DC, along with drummer Mark Gould and Ash Cooper on vocals. This line-up released a music video called I'm Your Nemesis and an updated version of "Nightstalker". Russ North parted company with Cloven Hoof for a final time in July 2012, following a controversial performance in Cyprus. Mark Gould left the band in August 2012, with Jake Oseland replacing him on drums in time for a series of live dates in 2013. The 2013 line-up of Cloven Hoof scheduled a debut UK concert appearance with Jameson Raid and Hollow Ground at Wolverhampton Civic Hall on 30 March 2013. On 27 April 2013, Cloven Hoof played a concert at the Parkhotel Hall in Tirol, Austria. The show was recorded by producer Patrick Engel for a future live album release. A studio album, provisionally entitled Resist or Serve, was planned for release on High Roller Records.

On 23 June 2013, Cloven Hoof played at the R-Mine Festival in Belgium, on a bill which included Hell, Tygers of Pan Tang and Tank. This was followed by an appearance at the Heavy Metal Night 6 Festival in Italy on 21 September 2013. In 2014, Cloven Hoof were added to the bill for the Sweden Rock Festival, with Black Sabbath and Alice Cooper. An appearance at the Power and Glory Festival in Hatfield was scheduled for 23 August 2014, with further European tour dates due to take place throughout the year.

Band members 
 Lee Payne – bass (1979–1990, 2000–present)
 Chris Dando – vocals
 Chris Coss – guitars (2011–present)
 Luke Hatton – guitars (2014–2018, 2020-present)
 Ash Baker - drums

Former members (those featured on albums) 
Vocals
 Russ North (1986–1990, 2006–2009, 2011–2012)
 Rob Kendrick (1985–1986)
 David Potter (1982–1984)
 Matt Moreton (2000–2006, 2009)

Guitar
 Steve Rounds (1982–1986)
 Andy Wood (1988–1990, 2004)
 Andy Shortland (2005–2006)
 Ben Read (2007–2010)
 Mick Powell (2007, 2008, 2009–2010)
 Ash Baker (2019)

Drums
 Kevin Pountney (1979–1986)
 Lynch Radinsky (2005–2006)
 Jon Brown (1987–1990, 2007–2010)
 Danny White (2017-2019) 
 Mark Harris Bristow (2019-2022)

Timeline

Discography

Studio albums
Cloven Hoof (1984)
Dominator (1988, re-released 2011 & 2012)
A Sultan's Ransom (1989, re-released 2012)
Eye of the Sun (2006)
Resist or Serve ( 6 June 2014)
Who Mourns for the Morning Star (28 April 2017)
The Age of Steel (24 April 2020)
Time Assassin (11 March 2022)

Live albums
Fighting Back (1986)

Compilation albums
The Definitive Part One (2008)

EPs
The Opening Ritual (1982)
Throne of Damnation (2010)

Demos
1982 Demo (1982)
Second 1982 Demo (1982)

Videos and DVDs
A Sultan's Ransom - Video Archive (DVD) (2010)

See also
List of new wave of British heavy metal bands

References

External links
 

Musical groups established in 1979
English power metal musical groups
Wolverhampton
Musical quintets
English heavy metal musical groups
Musical groups disestablished in 1990
Musical groups reestablished in 2000
New Wave of British Heavy Metal musical groups
Musical groups from West Midlands (county)